Dundee Cathedral may refer to the following cathedrals in Dundee:

 St Andrew's Cathedral, Dundee, Catholic
 St. Paul’s Cathedral, Dundee, Episcopal